Vincenzo Sommese (born 22 June 1976 in Nola) is an Italian former footballer.

Career
Sommese started his career at Nola of Serie C2. He was signed by Torino in November 1994, and made his Serie A debut on 6 April 1996, against Juventus F.C., but Torino fall to Serie B in that summer.

After a short return to Serie A in 1999/00 season, Sommese played in Serie B again in summer 2000.

But in October 2000, he was sold to Vicenza of Serie A in joint ownership bid, but the Serie A career end again after the club fall to Serie B in summer 2001.

He played half of the Serie B season for Vicenza, before returned to Serie A again for Piacenza on loan in January 2002.

He returned to Torino in summer 2002, but Sommese once again faced relegation to Serie B as the Turin club finished the last.

Sommese then joined Serie A newcomer Ancona, but faced his fifth relegation to Serie B.

Sommese received an offer from Modena, a first "currently" Serie B club at the time he was signed.

One season later, he joined Mantova of Serie B and played for two seasons, before he was banned from football due to betting.

In January 2008, after his ban has expired, he was signed by Ascoli of Serie B, and scored a goal in the debut.

Honours and awards
Serie B runner-up: 1999

References

External links
 Gazzetta.it profile

1976 births
Living people
People from Nola
Italian footballers
Torino F.C. players
L.R. Vicenza players
Piacenza Calcio 1919 players
A.C. Ancona players
Modena F.C. players
Mantova 1911 players
Ascoli Calcio 1898 F.C. players
Serie A players
Serie B players
Serie C players
Association football midfielders
Footballers from Campania
Sportspeople from the Province of Naples